The Almighty Johnsons is a New Zealand fantasy comedy-drama television series, which was created by James Griffin and Rachel Lang and is produced by South Pacific Pictures. It began airing its first series of ten episodes  in New Zealand on 7 February 2011. The second series of 13 episodes began broadcasting on 29 February 2012. A third series of 13 episodes premiered on 4 July 2013.

The show follows a student named Axl Johnson, who on his 21st birthday discovers his family members are reincarnated Norse gods. The only problem is, they do not have full control of their powers and it is up to Axl (the reincarnation of Odin) to restore them and ensure the family's survival by finding the reincarnation of Odin's wife, Frigg. Matters are complicated by the presence of several antagonistic or amorously interested Norse deities, given that the Johnsons are not the only such demigods living in exile in New Zealand. At the close of the second series, it is revealed that they are not the only pantheon resident there either, as Māori deities have also reincarnated, albeit in similarly restricted circumstances.

Series overview

Episodes

Series 1 (2011) 
The series premiered in the U.S. on 11 July 2014 and was watched 1.01 million viewers.

Series 2 (2012)

Series 3 (2013)

Webisodes

Gods Among Us (2013)

Home media

Box sets

Compilations 

Note

Notes
  Number includes additional viewers from a 9:00 p.m. rebroadcast airing the same night on TV3 Plus 1.
  Number includes additional viewers from a 10:40 p.m. rebroadcast airing the following Sunday night.

References

External links
 
 
 

Lists of comedy-drama television series episodes
Lists of New Zealand television series episodes